A. M. Cumaraswamy was the 32nd Surveyor General of Sri Lanka. He was appointed in 1973, succeeding R. A. Gunawardana, and held the office until 1973. He was succeeded by S. J. Munasinghe.

References

Surveyor General of Sri Lanka